Zgornje Poljčane (formerly Poljčane) is a settlement in the Municipality of Poljčane in northeastern Slovenia. It lies at the foothills of Mount Boč on the right bank of the Dravinja River. The area is part of the traditional region of Styria. It is now included with the rest of the municipality in the Drava Statistical Region.

Name
The name of the settlement was changed from Poljčane to Zgornje Poljčane in 1957. The change was made because a new settlement called Poljčane was created that same year, when the former villages of Maharska Vas and Pekel were merged into a single settlement.

Church
The parish church in the settlement is dedicated to the Holy Cross and belongs to the Roman Catholic Archdiocese of Maribor. It is a Romanesque building dating to the late 12th century. It has a Gothic belfry. In 1895 the church was extended and re-orientated with a complete new nave added. The sanctuary of the original church was converted to a side chapel.

References

External links
Zgornje Poljčane on Geopedia

Populated places in the Municipality of Poljčane